St. Charles High School is a public four-year high school located in St. Charles, Minnesota, United States. Founded in 1905, today the school serves over 260 students in grades 912. The school is located in the St. Charles Public Schools district.

Athletics
St. Charles High School offers eight sports for women (cross country, volleyball, soccer, dance team, basketball, softball, track, and golf), and eight sports for men (cross country, football, soccer, basketball, wrestling, baseball, track, and golf). A student wishing to play hockey may do so through Winona Senior High School.

Notable alumni
 Brad Nessler - sportscaster
Utica Queen - drag queen

References

External links 
 School district website

1905 establishments in Minnesota
Public high schools in Minnesota
Schools in Winona County, Minnesota